Burrinjucosteus asymmetricus is an extinct buchanosteid arthrodire placoderm.  Its fossils have been found in Emsian-aged marine strata of New South Wales, Australia.

B. asymmetricus is known from scraps of thoracic armor and the skullroof, which suggest a very large, flat animal.

References

Buchanosteidae
Prehistoric fish of Australia